William Hershaw (born Newport On Tay, Fife, 19 March 1957) is a Scottish poet, playwright, musician and Scots language activist.

Hershaw's first major collection of poetry, The Cowdenbeath Man, Scottish Cultural Press, 1998, was a series of elegies about the death of the coal mining industry in Central Fife. He won the Callum MacDonald Award for Winter Song in 2005, and The McCash Prize for Scots Poetry in 2011.

In 2012 he reconvened The Bowhill Players (originally a drama company founded by playwright Joe Corrie during the General Strike of 1926) as a musical ensemble performing at The Edinburgh Festival Fringe, writing new musical settings for Corrie's poetry.

In 2016 Grace Note published a Scots version of The Tempest and Michael, a ballad play about the medieval polymath Michael Scot of Balwearie. An audio recording of Michael has been performed by the Bowhill Players and was released under the Scotsoun label in 2021.

The Sair Road, published in 2018, is Hershaw's Scot's Language version of the Stations of the Cross set during the 1984 Miners' strike. This is a collection of poems illustrated by artist Les McConnell.

In 2020 Hershaw was runner up in the Scots poetry competition at the Wigtown Book Festival.

Further collaboration with McConnell produced Earth Bound Companions and Saul Vaigers - A Scottish Saints Calendar, both published in 2021.

William Hershaw is a member of the editorial board of the Scots Language Society.

Bibliography

Poetry collections
 Four Fife Poets/Fower Brigs Ti A Kinrick (with John Brewster, Harvey Holton, Tom Hubbard, Harvey Holton), Aberdeen University Press, 1988
 The Cowdenbeath Man, Scottish Cultural Press, 1997 
 Fifty Fife Sonnets/Makars, Akros Publications, 2005
 Johnny Aathin, Windfall Publications, 2010 
 Happyland, Fras Publications, 2011
 Postcairds Fae Woodwick Mill, Orkney Poems in Scots, Grace Note, 2015 
 Stars are the Aisles, Neepheid Press, 2016 
 Buirds, Roncadora Press, 2017
 The Sair Road, Grace Note Publications, 2018 ISBN 978-1-907676-96-3
 Earth Bound Companions, Grace Note Publications, 2021 ISBN 978-1-913162-15-3
 Saul Vaigers, Grace Note Publications, 2021 ISBN 978-1-913162-1-39

Selected Poetry Anthologies
 Dream State - The New Scottish Poets, Polygon, 1994
 Scotlands - Poets and the Nation, Carcanet, 2004
 Skein of Geese - Poems from the 2008 Stanza Festival, Stanza Publications
 The Smeddum Test, 21st Century Poems in Scots, Kennedy and Boyd, 2012
 Scotia Nova, Luath Press, 2014

Drama
 The Tempest, translated in Scots, Grace Note, 2016 
 Michael Scot of Balwearie, A Ballad Play in Scots, Grace Note, 2016, 
 Jennie Lee’s History Project, Grace Note, 2017

Novel
 Tammy Norrie, The House Daemon Of Seahouses, Grace Note Publications, 2014

Music
 A Fish Laid At The Door, Dances With Whippets Records/Birnam CD; 2002
 A Song Cycle For Craigencalt Ecology Centre, Dances With Whippets Records/Birnam CD 2009
 Cage Load Of Men - The Joe Corrie Project, Bowhill Players, Fife Council/Fras Publications/ Birnam CD 2013

Education
 Teaching Scots Language, Learning Teaching Scotland, 2002
 Scots Language and Literature - Examples and Activities, Learning Teaching Scotland, 2002

References

Scottish poets
Living people
1957 births